Moké (or Moke, birth name Monsengwo Kejwamfi), was a Congolese painter, born in Ibe, Bandundu Province, Democratic Republic of the Congo in 1950. He died on September 26, 2001 in Kinshasa, a city from which he drew inspiration.

Together with Chéri Samba, Chéri Chérin and other painters of the Kinshasa school like Cheik Ledy, Tshibumba Kanda-Matulu and Sim Simaro, Moké was one of the foremost depicters of Congolese popular life. He is considered a naivist, while he described himself as a "painter-journalist".

Exhibitions 

 2018 - E-mois, Museum of Contemporary Art Al Maaden, Marrakech, Morocco
 2016 - " Songeries et réjouissances ", Collection Philippe Pellering & Boris Vanhoutte, Musée Africain de Namur, Musée du Masque de Binche, Belgium
 2014 - Moké, une collection particulière 1991-1992, galerie Espace Lorraine, Bruxelles, Belgium
 2011 - Japancongo, Le Magasin, Grenoble, France.
 2010 - African Stories, Marrakech Art Fair, Marrakech, Morocco.
 2008 - Popular Painting from Kinshasa, Tate Modern, Londres, GB.
 2006 - 100% Africa, Guggenheim Museum (Bilbao), Spain.
 2005 - Arts of Africa, Grimaldi Forum, Monaco, France.
 2005 - African Art Now : Masterpieces from the Jean Pigozzi Collection, Museum of Fine Arts Houston, Houston, United States.
 2004 - Peinture populaire congolaise, ADEIAO, Centre d’Études Africaines, Maison des sciences de l’homme, Paris, France.
 2003 - Kin Moto na Bruxelles, Hôtel de ville de Bruxelles, Belgium.
 2003 - Regards Croisés, La Galerie d’Art de Creteil, Créteil, France.
 2003 - Der Rest der Welt, Neuffer am Park, Pirmasens, Germany.
 2002 - Monsenguro Kejwamfi dit Peintre Moke « Grand maître de la peinture zaïroise », Musée d'Art moderne et contemporain (Genève), Switzerland, (solo).
 2002 - Kinshasa, Congo, Moke, Cheri Samba, Rigobert; Espace Croisé, Centre d'art contemporain de Roubaix, France.
 2002 - Afrique dans les murs, Les Naufragés du Temps, Saint-Malo, France (solo).
 2001 - Un Art Populaire, Fondation Cartier pour l'art contemporain, Paris, France.
 1997 - "Ecole de Kinshasa", Galerie Peter Herrmann, Stuttgart, Germany
 1996 - Bomoi Mobimba Toute la vie, 7 artistes zaïrois, Collection Lucien Bilinelli, Centre d'art contemporain, Palais des Beaux-Arts de Charleroi, Belgium.
 1995-1996 - An Inside Story : African Art of our Time Beyong Art, Setagaya Art Museum, Tokyo; The Tokushima Modern Art Museum; Himeji City Museum of Art; Koriyama City Museum of Art; Marugame Inokuma-Genichiro Museum of Contemporary Art; The Museum of Fine Art, Gifu, Japan.
 1993-1994 - Skizzen eines Projektes, Afrika Im Ludwig Forum für Internationale Kunst, Ludwig, Germany.
 1992 - Out of Africa, Galerie Saatchi, London, G.B.
 1991-1992 - Africa Hoy/Africa Now, Centro Atlantico de Arte Moderno, Las Palmas de Gran Canaria; Cultural Center and Contemporary Art, Mexico City; Groningen Museum, Groningen, the Netherlands.
 1991 - Ny Afrikansk Billedkunst Rundetarn, Copenhagen, Denmark.
 1985 - Peintre Populaires du Zaire; L'art vivant d'Afrique Centrale, Université de Montréal, Marius-Barbeau Museum, Gallery Trompe-l'œil, Media Center, Québec.
 1983 - Goethe-Institut, Kinshasa, DRC.
 1979 - Centre culturel français, Kinshasa, DRC, (solo),
 1979 - Moderne Kunst aus Afrika, Festival de Berlin Horizante'79, Stautliche Kunsthalle Berlin, Germany.
 1978 - Art Partout, Académie des beaux-arts, CIAF, Kinshasa, DRC.
 1969 - Première Foire internationale de Kinshasa, DRC.
 1968 - Exposition artistique et artisanale de Kinshasa, Ministère de la Culture et du Tourisme, Parc de la Révolution, Kinshasa, DRC.

References

Democratic Republic of the Congo painters
People from Kinshasa
1950 births
2001 deaths